The 2019 South American Beach Games (Spanish:Juegos Suramericanos de Playa), officially the IV South American Beach Games, was an international multi-sport event held in Rosario, Argentina from March 14 – 23. It was the first time of the event in Argentina.

Participating teams
All 14 nations of the Organización Deportiva Suramericana (ODESUR) were expected to compete in these Beach Games.

  (host)

Sports

 Beach handball (Details)
 Beach football
 Beach rugby
 Beach tennis
 Beach volleyball
 Canoeing
 Coastal rowing
 Open water swimming
 Sailing
 Skateboard
 Stand Up Paddle Surf
 Triathlon
 Water skiing

Medal table
Key:
 
Final medal tally.

References

External links
 Official site

South American Beach Games
South American Beach Games
South American Beach Games
South American Beach Games